Kappa Telescopii (κ Telescopii) is a solitary, yellow-hued star in the southern constellation of Telescopium. With an apparent visual magnitude of +5.20, it is visible to the naked eye. Based upon an annual parallax shift of 12.00 mas as seen from Earth, it is located around 272 light years from the Sun.

At the age of around 1.25 billion years, this an evolved giant star with a stellar classification of G8/K0 III, showing a spectrum with characteristics intermediate between a G-type and a K-type star. It has an estimated 1.9 times the mass of the Sun and 10.5 times the Sun's radius. The star is radiating 77.6 times the solar luminosity from its photosphere at an effective temperature of 4,968 K. It is unclear whether it is cooling or heating up on its evolutionary pathway through the red clump.

References

G-type giants
Horizontal-branch stars
Telescopii, Kappa
Telescopium (constellation)
Durchmusterung objects
174295
092646
7087